Mau Junction  is a junction station located in the city of Mau in the Indian state of Uttar Pradesh. It falls on Allahabad–Mau–Gorakhpur main line. An important station of the region, it is well connected to important cities like New Delhi, Mumbai, Surat, Ahmedabad, Kolkata, Pune, Lucknow, Aligarh, Kanpur, Allahabad, Jaipur, Ranchi, Varanasi, etc.

Background 
At starting it was a metre-gauge line. But in 1992 it converted into broad gauge. The present building towards city side was constructed in 1995 during the regime of Kalpnath Rai as a Cabinet Minister in Indian Government.

Development 
Recently Railway Board has decided to establish a new line between Mau Junction and Dildarnagar via Ghazipur. After establishment of this new line Mau will be directly connected to Howrah–Delhi main line and Howrah–Allahabad–Mumbai line. Mau is just 93 km away from Varanasi. Mau–Shahganj railway line was started in 1901.

Passenger amenities

There are 3 platforms. After Aunrihar–Bhatni section and Mau–Shahganj section, doubling the number of platforms will be 6. There are two entries at the station one is  'Station Road Side' and other is 'City Side'. Goods rake point also available at Mau Junction but later it will be shifted to Khurhat and rake point will be converted to platforms after development as a Terminal Station.

See also

Mau Express
Kerakat railway station

References

External links

Railway stations in Mau district
Railway junction stations in Uttar Pradesh
Varanasi railway division
Mau